Všenory is a municipality and village in Prague-West District in the Central Bohemian Region of the Czech Republic. It has about 1,700 inhabitants.

Notable people
For a period in the 1920s, Všenory was home to the Russian poet Marina Tsvetaeva; the municipality now hosts a Marina Tsvetaeva Centre, with an exhibition about her life and about 350 books related to her.

References

Villages in Prague-West District